The women's team pursuit in the 2008–09 ISU Speed Skating World Cup was contested over three races on three occasions, out of a total of nine World Cup occasions for the season, with the first occasion taking place in Berlin, Germany, on 7–9 November 2008, and the last occasion involving the event taking place in Erfurt, Germany, on 30 January – 1 February 2009.

The Czech Republic won the cup, while the United States came second, and the Netherlands came third. The defending champions, Canada, ended up in eighth place.

Top three

Race medallists

Final standings 
Standings as of 1 February 2009 (end of the season).

References 

Women team pursuit
ISU